Laugh Factory is a chain of comedy clubs in the United States. The chain is owned by Laugh Factory Inc., and the founder and current chief executive is Jamie Masada.

Endurance record 
The Laugh Factory keeps track of an endurance record for the comedian who can deliver the longest single set at the club. The record-holding performances are listed below:

Acts of charity 

On December 8, 2010, at 4:38 pm, the Laugh Factory broke the Guinness World Record for "Longest Continuous Stand Up Comedy Show (Multiple Comedians)". The record was previously held by Comic Strip Live, who set the original record of 50 hours. The Laugh Factory surpassed 50 hours on Wednesday and continued non-stop until 10:38 pm Thursday December 9 when they stopped and set a new record of 80 hours. Dom Irrera was on stage when the record was broken, and Deon Cole was on stage when the new record was set. The event, titled "Toy to the World", was paired with a Toy Drive for Children's Hospital. Over 130 different comedians performed, and the event was live-streamed over the internet. The Laugh Factory held this record until April 15, 2015, when the record was broken by jokesters at The East Room in Nashville, Tennessee.

Charity fundraisers have been held at the club, including benefit nights for the Red Cross, USO, Cops for Causes, Comics Without Borders, Wounded Warriors, Middle Eastern Comedy Fest, and Stand Up for India.

Locations 
Outlets of the chain are located in:
 Chicago
 Hollywood
 Las Vegas
 Long Beach
 Reno

References

External links 

 Laugh Factory on YouTube
 

Nightclubs in Los Angeles County, California
Comedy clubs in the United States
Landmarks in Los Angeles
Event venues established in 1979
1979 establishments in California
Buildings and structures in Hollywood, Los Angeles
Buildings and structures in Long Beach, California
Tourist attractions in Los Angeles
Comedy clubs in California